Thomas Van Dyke King (March 9, 1924 – November 12, 2015) was an American professional basketball player. He played a season for the Detroit Falcons of the Basketball Association of America (BAA), the league that would later become the modern NBA.

After a college career at the University of Michigan, King signed with the Falcons in 1946. King (who would later prove successful in business) negotiated roles as publicity director, business manager and travelling secretary for the team. This combination of duties netted him an annual salary of $16,500, making him the highest paid player in the league, despite averaging only 5.1 points per game on the season.

King was married to Canadian figure skater and Olympic gold medallist, Barbara Ann Scott.

BAA career statistics

Regular season

References

External links
 

1924 births
2015 deaths
American men's basketball players
Basketball players from Michigan
Basketball players from Cincinnati
Detroit Falcons (basketball) players
Guards (basketball)
Michigan Wolverines men's basketball players
People from East Lansing, Michigan